Maryland School may refer to:

Maryland School for the Deaf, Maryland, United States
Maryland School for the Blind, Maryland, United States
Maryland's School, Christchurch, New Zealand